Jill Walker Rettberg (born Jill Walker in 1971) is Professor of Digital Culture at the University of Bergen. She is "a leading researcher in self-representation in social media" and a European Research Council grantee (2018-2023) with the project Machine Vision in Everyday Life: Playful Interactions with Visual Technologies in Digital Art, Games, Narratives and Social Media. Rettberg is known for innovative research dissemination in social media, having started her research blog jill/txt in 2000, and developed Snapchat Research Stories in 2017.

Education and academic career 
After completing an MA in Comparative Literature at the University of Bergen in 1998, Rettberg worked for a year on a research project developing educational MOOs, and in 2003 completed a doctoral degree in Humanistic Informatics at the University of Bergen under the supervision of Espen Aarseth.

Rettberg was hired as an associate professor at the University of Bergen after her PhD, and was promoted to full Professor of Digital Culture in 2009. In addition to her tenured position at the University of Bergen, Rettberg has been a visiting scholar at the Royal Melbourne Institute of Technology, University of Illinois Chicago, Massachusetts Institute of Technology and the University of Chicago.

In addition to her academic positions, Jill Walker Rettberg is a member of the Research Council of Norway's portfolio board for Humanities and Social Sciences (2019-2023), and was previously a member of Arts Council Norway's research and development committee. She co-authored the official Norwegian report NOU 2013:2 on hindrances for digital growth.

Blogging and social media 
With the book Seeing Ourselves Through Technology: How We Use Selfies, Blogs and Wearable Devices to See and Shape Ourselves Rettberg examined three key modes of self-representation in social media: textual, as in blogs, visual, as in selfies, and quantitative, as in self-tracking and the growing quantitative self movement. Seeing these modes in combination is key to understanding social media as a whole.

Books 

 Seeing Ourselves Through Technology: How We Use Selfies, Blogs and Wearable Devices to See and Shape Ourselves. Basingbroke: Palgrave, October 2014.
 Blogging. Cambridge: Polity Press, 2008, 2nd ed. 2014. (1st ed. trans.: Polish, Korean.)
 (co-editor, with Hilde Corneliussen) Digital Culture, Play, and Identity: A World of Warcraft Reader. Cambridge MA: MIT Press, 2008.

Major grants and awards 

 ERC Consolidator grant (€2 million) 2018–2023.
 John Lovas Award for Best Academic Weblog for Snapchat Research Stories
 The Meltzer Prize for Excellence in Research Dissemination, 2005. 
 The Inaugural Ted Nelson Newcomer Award at the ACM Hypertext conference in 1999.

References

External links 

 Snapchat Research Stories. Archive on YouTube. https://www.youtube.com/playlist?list=PL46Xs2itPIMlDBL0tPfg-2WzXwZrnTePh
 jill/txt - a research blog active since 2000. https://jilltxt.net

1971 births
Living people
Norwegian scientists
Australian scientists
Norwegian bloggers
Norwegian women scientists
Australian women scientists
Norwegian women bloggers
European Research Council grantees
Academic staff of the University of Bergen